{{Automatic taxobox
| fossil_range = Late Oligocene, 
| image = Mirocetus riabinini life restoration 2.jpg
| image_caption= Life restoration
| taxon = Mirocetus
| authority = Mchedlidze, 1970
| type_species = M. riabinini 
| type_species_authority = Mchedlidze, 1970
}}Mirocetus is a genus of archaic odontocete from the late Oligocene (Chattian) of Azerbaijan. Like many other primitive odontocetes, its classification has been fluid since its description.

ClassificationMirocetus riabinini is based on a skull from late Oligocene (Chattian) deposits in Azerbaijan. Although originally assigned to Patriocetidae in the original description, it was later assigned to the mysticete family Aetiocetidae by Mchedlidze (1976). Fordyce (1981, 2002) treated Mirocetus as Odontoceti incertae sedis in recognition of its primitiveness, and a 2015 paper by Albert Sanders and Jonathan Geisler recognized the genus as sufficiently distinct from other basal odontocete families to warrant its own family, Mirocetidae. However, a cladistic analysis of Olympicetus by Velez-Juarbe (2017) recovers Mirocetus'' as a member of Xenorophidae, rendering Mirocetidae a synonym of Xenorophidae.

References

Fossil taxa described in 1970
Prehistoric cetaceans
Oligocene cetaceans